The Regina Symphony Orchestra (RSO) was founded by Frank Laubach, in Regina, Saskatchewan, as the Regina Orchestral Society in 1908, giving its inaugural concert December 3 of that same year. Becoming the Regina Choral and Orchestral Society in 1919, and merging briefly with the Regina Male Voice Choir as the Regina Philharmonic Association in 1924, it returned to independent status as the Regina Symphony in 1926, presenting its first regular season (1927–1928) under W. Knight Wilson.

For many years an orchestra of 50 players, it grew to 70 in the 1960s. From 1929, its home was Darke Hall on College Avenue until it moved to the Saskatchewan Centre of the Arts in 1970.

The orchestra performs over 30 concerts every season to over 30,000 people over a 37-week season.

King Charles III, granted his patronage to the orchestra in September, 2008, making the RSO the fourth orchestra in the world to be granted this honour by the heir to the Canadian throne.

The orchestra has performed with the South Saskatchewan Youth Orchestra (begun in 1977 under the RSO's sponsorship), the Royal Winnipeg Ballet, the National Ballet, the Regina Symphony Philharmonic Chorus (established in 1973) and Alberta Opera. The orchestra has also been broadcast regularly by CBC Radio.

Conductors
Regina Symphony conductors have been:
 Frank Laubach 1908-1922
 W(illiam) Knight Wilson 1923-1941 and 1945–1955
 Arthur Collingwood 1941-42 (Conservatory)
 John Thornicroft 1942-45 (Conservatory), 1955-1958
 Paul McIntyre 1959-1960
 Howard Leyton-Brown 1960-1971
 Boris Brott 1971-1973
 Ted Kardash 1973-1974
 Timothy Vernon 1975-1976
 Guest conductors 1976-1978
 Gregory Millar 1978-1981
 Simon Streatfeild 1981-1984
 Derrick Inouye 1984-1989
 Vladimir Conta 1989-1997
 Victor Sawa 1997-2016
 Gordon Gerrard 2016-

Concertmasters
Concertmasters have been:
 Marion B. Kinnee 1926-1932, 1933–35
 Jean Eilers 1932-33, 1935–36
 John Thornicroft 1936-1955
 Lloyd Blackman 1955-1959 and 1960–1975
 Elizabeth Boychuk 1959-1960
 Malcolm Lowe 1975-1977
 Brian Boychuk 1974-75 (Acting/Assistant) 1977-1978
 Howard Leyton-Brown 1978-1989
 Brian Johnson 1989-1990 
 Guests 1990-1991
 Carmen Constantinescu 1991-1992
 Noel Laporte 1992-1998
 Moshe Hammer 1998-1999
 Eduard Minevich 1999-2012
 Karen Constant 2012-2014 (acting CM)
 Simon MacDonald 2014-2017
 Christian Robinson 2017-2018 (acting CM)
 Christian Robinson 2018-

See also
 List of symphony orchestras
 Canadian classical music

Notes

External links

Musical groups established in 1908
Canadian orchestras
Culture of Regina, Saskatchewan
Musical groups from Regina, Saskatchewan
Organizations based in Canada with royal patronage
1908 establishments in Saskatchewan